Nippon News Network (NNN) is a Japanese commercial television network owned by Nippon Television, which itself is controlled by the Yomiuri Shimbun newspaper. The network's responsibility includes the syndication of national television news bulletins to its regional affiliates, and news exchange between the stations.

NNN also operates NTV News24, a 24-hour news channel available on subscription television platforms and also aired on select NNN affiliates during overnights.

Distribution of non-news television programmes is handled by Nippon Television Network System (NNS), another network set up by NTV.

Stations

Bold indicates founding members of Nippon News Network

Former stations
Bold indicates former primary affiliate

References

External links
 Nippon TV NEWS 24
 Official Site (Japanese)
 English-language news

 
24-hour television news channels in Japan
Television channels and stations established in 1966